Charles Francis Xavier Sancrainte (born Sanscrainte, February 28, 1838 – May 5, 1910) was an American soldier who fought for the Union Army during the American Civil War. He received the Medal of Honor for valor.

Biography
Sancrainte received the Medal of Honor on July 25, 1892, for his actions at the Battle of Atlanta on July 22, 1864, while with Company B of the 15th Michigan Volunteer Infantry Regiment.

Medal of Honor citation

Citation:

The President of the United States of America, in the name of Congress, takes pleasure in presenting the Medal of Honor to Private Charles Francis Sancrainte, United States Army, for extraordinary heroism on 22 July 1864, while serving with Company B, 15th Michigan Infantry, in action at Atlanta, Georgia. Private Sancrainte voluntarily scaled the enemy's breastworks and signaled to his commanding officer in charge; also in single combat captured the colors of the 5th Texas Regiment (Confederate States of America)."

See also

List of American Civil War Medal of Honor recipients: Q–S

References

External links

1838 births
1910 deaths
Union Army soldiers
United States Army Medal of Honor recipients
American Civil War recipients of the Medal of Honor
People from Monroe County, Michigan
Military personnel from Michigan